Niklas Stegmann (born July 2, 1987 in Essen) is a German footballer. He made his professional Bundesliga debut on December 17, 2005, when he came on as a substitute in the 83rd minute for MSV Duisburg in a game against 1. FSV Mainz 05.

References

1987 births
Living people
German footballers
MSV Duisburg players
FC Schalke 04 players
Bundesliga players
Association football forwards
VfB Homberg players
Footballers from Essen